The vizier was the highest official in ancient Egypt to serve the pharaoh (king) during the Old, Middle, and New Kingdoms. Vizier is the generally accepted rendering of ancient Egyptian ,  etc., among Egyptologists. The viziers were often appointed by the pharaoh. During the 4th Dynasty and early 5th Dynasty, viziers were exclusively drawn from the royal family; from the period around the reign of Neferirkare Kakai onwards, they were chosen according to loyalty and talent or inherited the position from their fathers.

Responsibilities
The viziers were appointed by the pharaohs and often belonged to a pharaoh's family. The vizier's paramount duty was to supervise the running of the country, much like a prime minister. At times this included small details such as sampling the city's water supply. All other lesser supervisors and officials, such as tax collectors and scribes, reported to the vizier. The judiciary was part of the civil administration, and the vizier also sat in the High Court. At any time, the pharaoh could exert his own control over any aspect of government, overriding the vizier's decisions. The vizier also supervised the security of the pharaoh and the palace by overseeing the comings and goings of palace visitors. The viziers often acted as the pharaoh's seal bearer as well, and the vizier would record trade. From the Fifth Dynasty onwards, viziers, who by then were the highest civilian bureaucratic official, held supreme responsibility for the administration of the palace and government, including jurisdiction, scribes, state archives, central granaries, treasury, storage of surplus products and their redistribution, and supervision of building projects such as the royal pyramid. In the New Kingdom, there was a vizier for Upper Egypt and Lower Egypt each.

Installation of the Vizier 

According to the Installation of the Vizier, a New Kingdom document describing the office of the vizier, there were certain traits and behaviors that were required to be a vizier:

Act by the law
Judge fairly
Do not act willfully or headstrong

List of viziers

Early Dynastic period

Old Kingdom

Middle Kingdom and Second Intermediate Period

New Kingdom

Third Intermediate Period

Late Period

See also
Vizier
Shogun

References

External links

The vizierate
aldokkan.com

Ancient Egyptian titles
Noble titles
Positions of authority